is a Prefectural Natural Park on and around the islands of Tarama and Minna, in the village of Tarama, Okinawa Prefecture, Japan.

See also
 National Parks of Japan
 Parks and gardens in Okinawa Prefecture

References

External links
 Detailed map of the Park - Tarama Island
 Detailed map of the Park - Minna Island

Parks and gardens in Okinawa Prefecture
Tarama, Okinawa
Protected areas established in 2011
2011 establishments in Japan